Typhoon Rex, known in the Philippines as Typhoon Deling, was the 4th named storm in 1998 Pacific typhoon season, and it approached Japan in late August. Rex did not made landfall in Japan (It stayed out at sea east of Japan), but 22 people were killed in heavy rains in some parts of Japan due to the weather front and Rex.

Meteorological history 

An active Tropical Upper Tropospheric Trough allowed for the development of Tropical Depression 6W on August 22, east of Luzon. It moved westward initially, but as the trough weakened a ridge to the east, it moved northeastward where it became a tropical storm on the 23rd. Rex slowly intensified to become a typhoon on the 26th, followed by reaching a peak of  winds on the 28th south of Japan. As it moved northward, it brought heavy flooding to Honshū, Japan, amounting to 13 deaths and moderate damage from mudslides across the island. Another trough pulled the storm eastward, saving Japan from a direct hit, and Rex continued northeastward to an unusually high latitude near 50°, when it became extratropical on the 9th near the Aleutian Islands, east of the International Date Line.

Impact 
Due to heavy rains caused the weather front and Rex, 25 people were killed, 486 houses were destroyed, 13,927 houses were inundated in Japan. In Tochigi and Fukushima prefectures, experienced particularly heavy rains, with daily precipitation exceeded 600mm in Nasu (August 27).

References

External links

1998 Pacific typhoon season
Typhoons in Japan